Russell James Spence (born 3 January 1960 in Bradford, Yorkshire) is an English racing driver. He now runs a construction business in London. In 2011, Spence was jailed for 13 weeks for his part in a fraud scam involving a chain of car washes.

Early career
He first started in Hill climb events and moved into single seater racing in 1981 when he entered Formula Three. After a single Formula Three race, in the 1981 British Grand Prix support race, finishing 27th, Spence dropped back to the junior ranks for the next season. In 1982, he was champion in the Donington Park Formula Ford 1600. His good form continued in 1983, winning the EFDA Townsend Thorsen European Formula Ford 2000 Championship. During 1983, he returned to Formula Three with Eddie Jordan Racing for a one-off outing in the European Championship.

Formula Three
Come 1984, Spence had signed for Mint Engineering – Warmastyle Racing, for his first full season off British Formula Three, in their Ralt-Volkswagen RT3/84. By only the fourth round, his experience of racing in Europe paid dividends, by winning the Grote Prijs van Zolder, at Zolder. In a season dominated by Johnny Dumfries, Spence scored two more wins, with back-to-back races at Donington Park and Oulton Park. Although he was Dumfries closest rival for the title, Spence was pipped third place by Allen Berg.

Spence stayed in British Formula Three, in 1985 for another crack at the title with PMC Motorsport, abroad a Reynard-Volkswagen 853. He had a brilliant start to the season, winning four of the first six races, two at Thruxton, one at Silverstone as well as retaining the Grote Prijs van Zolder. By the mid-season break he led the standing by five points from Andy Wallace. However, the Reynard's early season advantage had vanished, as the Ralt RT30 came on strong, winning all the remaining rounds. During this period, his team, PMC Motorsport folded, leaving him to quickly build another team, now using a Ralt RT30. Despite this, he was only two points adrift of the championship lead going into the final two rounds. With a DNF in at Zandvoort, and an 11th place at Silverstone, this saw Spence drop to third in the end-of-year standings.

Formula 3000

He got a drive in the second year of the International Formula 3000 Series in 1986. This was very much thought of as the proving ground for drivers who wished to get a drive in Formula One, after replacing Formula Two. Driving for Eddie Jordan Racing part way of the season before switching to Onyx Racing, his first season was an unsuccessful one, with a best place finish of sixth at the Birmingham Superprix. In 1987, he drove for Murray Taylor Racing. After a poor start, he had a strong finish to the year, with two podiums in the final two races. A second place at Le Mans followed by a third-place finish at Jarama, saw him finish the season in tenth place.

1988 was a terrible season for him. He drove for three different teams through the year, Team Ralt, Madgwick Motorsport and Onyx Racing, in three different cars. Despite entering all the rounds he only finished one race, with an eleventh place at Le Mans, he finished the season with no points. At the end of 1988, he retired from racing.

Birmingham Superprix Protest

He is most famous in the Formula 3000 championship for an incident that took place during the 1988 Birmingham Superprix. During the first lap, German driver Volker Weidler spun his car, blocking the circuit and causing a traffic jam of other cars behind him. With the front of the field driving away, Spence was furious that the race was not being red flagged. When the marshalls tried to push his car round, he kept his foot on the brake pedal in protest. With the car unable to be pushed and Spence not getting out, a track side crane was used to hoist his car off the track. The crane lifted the car up in the air with him still inside, waving his arms around for the marshalls to put him back down.

Stateside

Spence made his racing comeback in 1992, in the SCCA Toyota Atlantic Championship. Abroad a Reynard-Toyota 92H, sponsored by Virgin Airways, Spence won his first two races in the United States; at Miami and Phoenix. Adding a further victory at Watkins Glen in the sixth round, helped Spence to finish fourth in the final standing, earning him a total of US$43,625.
As this series supporting the Champ Cars, this should have assisted Spence upwards, however 1993 brought just two drives in Toyota Atlantics, not starting one nor finishing the other. 1984 was no better. In two outings for Euromotorsport, Spence at least finished; 4th place in the Monterey Sports Car Grand Prix, at Laguna Seca and 14th in an IMSA Supercar race in Phoenix.

BTCC
After five-year break, Spence returned to racing as an independent in the 1999 British Touring Car Championship in an ex-works Renault Laguna for Arena International. His time in the BTCC did not go well. The first part of the season was full of incidents, ending at the fifth meeting of the season at Oulton Park when he crashed the car over the catch fence at Lodge corner. After the Croft rounds, he was replaced in the team by 1991 champion Will Hoy. He ended the season eighteenth with three points.

Racing record

Career highlights

International Race Victories

Complete International Formula 3000 results
(key) (Races in bold indicate pole position; races in italics indicate fastest lap.)

Complete British Touring Car Championship results
(key) (Races in bold indicate pole position - 1 point awarded all races) (Races in italics indicate fastest lap) (* signifies that driver lead feature race for at least one lap - 1 point awarded)

References

External links
BTCC.net Official 1999 standings.
BTCC Pages Profile.

1960 births
Living people
English racing drivers
British Formula Three Championship drivers
International Formula 3000 drivers
Atlantic Championship drivers
British Touring Car Championship drivers
English fraudsters
Arena Motorsport drivers
EuroInternational drivers